Tęcza (Polish for rainbow) can refer to:
 Tęcza, Świętokrzyskie Voivodeship (a village in Poland)
 Tęcza (Warsaw) (a monument in Warsaw, Poland)
 Tęcza (music band) (Polish youth music group from the 90s)